Squadron Leader Roy Kirkwood McConnell was a World War I flying ace from Canada credited with seven aerial victories. His award of the Distinguished Flying Cross noted both aerial victories, as well as gallantry in hazardous ground attack missions.

He returned to his native Canada in 1919, and made his living in the business world until 1940. He then returned to military service, joining the Royal Canadian Air Force in a junior rank and rapidly rising to become a squadron leader. After holding crucial posts in training aviators for the war effort, he was medically discharged in April 1945.

Early life
Roy Kirkwood McConnell was born 19 December 1898 in Victoria, British Columbia, Canada. He graduated from Victoria High School, British Columbia in 1916. He was a student when he enlisted into military service on 1 May 1917 in Victoria. He named his next of kin as Thomas McConnell. After joining the military, the younger McConnell stayed in Canada until August 1917.

World War I
After shipping to the British Isles, McConnell underwent aviation training that began on 14 September 1917 at Turnhill, England. After completion of training, he was assigned to No. 46 Squadron of the Royal Flying Corps on 11 November 1917. He would not score his first aerial victory until 23 March 1918. By 8 September 1918, he had run his string to seven wins. On 16 September 1918, he was withdrawn from combat and posted to the Home Establishment in England. He was awarded  a Distinguished Flying Cross on 28 September 1918.

List of aerial victories
See also Aerial victory standards of World War I

Post World War I
McConnell's Distinguished Flying Cross was gazetted on 3 December 1918, with the award citation appearing in the Edinburgh Gazette on the 5th:

"This officer has accounted for five enemy machines—destroying two and driving down three out of control, proving himself a gallant fighting airman. He has also shown conspicuous bravery in attacking troops and transport."

He returned to Canada on 27 February 1919. He was a businessman engaged in sales between the World Wars. However, he joined the Royal Canadian Air Force as a pilot officer in May 1940 to serve in World War II. He was promoted rapidly, rising to Squadron Leader in 1941. He was posted to five different training schools in Canada, holding responsible posts in each. He was medically discharged in April 1945. Nothing more is known of him after that time.

References
 Above the Trenches: A Complete Record of the Fighter Aces and Units of the British Empire Air Forces 1915-1920. Christopher F. Shores, Norman L. R. Franks, Russell Guest. Grub Street, 1990. , .

Endnotes

1898 births
Year of death missing
People from Victoria, British Columbia
Canadian World War I flying aces
Recipients of the Distinguished Flying Cross (United Kingdom)